The Jonas R. Shurtleff House was a historic house on United States Route 201 in Winslow, Maine.  Built about 1850, it was a distinctive local example of vernacular Gothic Revival architecture.  It was listed on the National Register of Historic Places in 1974.  It was demolished some time after 2018.

Description and history
The Jonas R. Shurtleff House was in southern Winslow, on the west side of US 201, a short distance south of its junction with Maine State Route 137. It was a two-story wood-frame structure, with a gabled roof, vertical board siding, and a granite foundation. The main roof gable and side gables were adorned with bargeboard trim. The ground floor windows were topped by extended cornices supported by narrow paired brackets, while second-floor windows were topped by square-headed moulding. The main entrance was sheltered by a porch with latticework trim forming Gothic arches.  Above the entrance was a three-part Palladian style window, and there was a triangular multilight window in the gable point above. The house's interior was decorated with modest Greek Revival trim.

The house was built sometime between 1850 and 1853 by Jonas Shurtleff, who had purchased the land in 1849. Its designer is not known; its more fanciful features, although borrowing in some ways from published materials on residential Gothic architecture, were largely vernacular. The house had been a local landmark and minor tourist attraction since its construction.

See also
National Register of Historic Places listings in Kennebec County, Maine

References

Houses on the National Register of Historic Places in Maine
National Register of Historic Places in Kennebec County, Maine
Gothic Revival architecture in Maine
Houses completed in 1850
Houses in Kennebec County, Maine
Winslow, Maine